Chistaya Polyana is a rural locality (a selo) and the administrative center of Chistopolyanskoye Rural Settlement, Ramonsky District, Voronezh Oblast, Russia. The population was 499 as of 2010. There are 17 streets.

Geography 
Chistaya Polyana is located 44 km west of Ramon (the district's administrative centre) by road. Perlevka is the nearest rural locality.

References 

Rural localities in Ramonsky District